The 2013–14 A-League was the 37th season of top-flight soccer in Australia, and the ninth of the A-League since its establishment in 2004. The season began on 11 October 2013, with Western Sydney Wanderers as the defending A-League Premiers and Central Coast Mariners as the defending A-League Champions. The regular season concluded on 13 April 2014, with Brisbane Roar crowned Premiers. The 2014 Grand Final took place on 4 May 2014, with Brisbane Roar claiming their third Championship with a 2–1 win in extra time against Western Sydney Wanderers.

This was the first A-League season to be broadcast on free-to-air television, after SBS obtained the rights to a live Friday night game each week of the season, and all finals games on a one-hour delay, on a $160 million four-year broadcast deal.

Clubs

Personnel and kits

Transfers

Managerial changes

Foreign players

The following do not fill a Visa position:
1Those players who were born and started their professional career abroad but have since gained Australian citizenship (and New Zealand citizenship, in the case of Wellington Phoenix);
2Australian citizens (and New Zealand citizens, in the case of Wellington Phoenix) who have chosen to represent another national team;
3Injury Replacement Players, or National Team Replacement Players;
4Guest Players (eligible to play a maximum of ten games)

Salary cap exemptions and captains

Regular season

League table

Home and away season
The 2013–14 season will see each team play 27 games, kicking off on 11 October 2013, and concluding on 13 April 2014.

Round 1

Round 2

Round 3

Round 4

Round 5

Round 6

Round 7

Round 8

Round 9

Round 10

Round 11

Round 12

Round 13

Round 14

Round 15

Round 16

Round 17

Round 18

Round 19

Round 20

Round 21

Round 22

Round 23

Round 24

Round 25

Round 26

Round 27

Finals series

Elimination-finals

Semi-finals

Grand Final

Season statistics

Top scorers

Own goals

Attendances
These are the attendance records of each of the teams at the end of the home and away season. The table does not include finals series attendances.

Top 10 Season Attendances

Discipline
The Fair Play Award will go to the team with the lowest points on the fair play ladder at the conclusion of the home and away season.

Current as of 13 April 2014

Awards

End-of-season awards
 Johnny Warren Medal – Thomas Broich, Brisbane Roar
 NAB Young Footballer of the Year – Adam Taggart, Newcastle Jets
 Nike Golden Boot Award – Adam Taggart, Newcastle Jets (16 goals)
 Goalkeeper of the Year – Eugene Galekovic, Adelaide United
 Manager of the Year – Mike Mulvey, Brisbane Roar
 Fair Play Award – Brisbane Roar
 Referee of the Year – Peter Green
 Goal of the Year – Orlando Engelaar, Melbourne Heart (Melbourne Heart v Central Coast Mariners, 23 March 2014)

See also

 2013–14 Adelaide United FC season
 2013–14 Brisbane Roar FC season
 2013–14 Central Coast Mariners FC season
 2013–14 Melbourne Heart FC season
 2013–14 Melbourne Victory FC season
 2013–14 Newcastle Jets FC season
 2013–14 Perth Glory FC season
 2013–14 Sydney FC season
 2013–14 Wellington Phoenix FC season
 2013–14 Western Sydney Wanderers FC season

References

 
A-League Men seasons
Aus
1
1